Pirzada Md. Abbas Siddique (born 1987) is an Islamic scholar, social activist and Indian politician who founded the Indian Secular Front political party in 2021. He is a cleric of the Furfura Sharif in Hooghly, West Bengal and is the scion of the Siddique family, which is the founder and custodian of the Furfura Sharif.

Early life 
Abbas Siddiqui was born to Pirzada Ali Akbar Siddiqui. He is the great-grandson of Mohammad Abu Bakr Siddique who established the Silsila-e-Furfura (Order of Furfura Sharif) and is the nephew of Toha Siddiqui. Siddiqui has studied Islamic Theology from Furfura Fatehia Senior Madrasah.

Political career 
On 21 January 2021 he formed his party Indian Secular Front which will be contesting in the 2021 West Bengal Elections. Initially they planned to join hands with AIMIM leader Asaduddin Owaisi. However, that plan faltered and instead he joined hands with the Left Front (comprising various communist parties) and the Congress to form the Sanjukta Morcha. His party Indian Secular Front contested on a borrowed symbol from Rashtriya Secular Majlis Party (RSMP) which is a Bihar-based party.

References 

Living people
Leaders of political parties in India
Indian politicians
West Bengal politicians
People from Hooghly district
Indian Islamic religious leaders
Bengali Muslim scholars of Islam
21st-century Bengalis
Activists from West Bengal
1987 births
Indian Secular Front politicians